The Ewellic script (pronounced yoo-WELL-ik) was invented by Doug Ewell in 1980 as a way to represent the pronunciation of English and other languages without the precision of the International Phonetic Alphabet (IPA).

References

Further reading

Phonetic alphabets
Writing systems introduced in 1980